The Champneys, later Dalrymple-Champneys Baronetcy, of Littlemeads in the County of Sussex, was a title in the Baronetage of the United Kingdom. It was created on 13 July 1910 for the distinguished physician Francis Champneys. The second Baronet assumed the additional surname of Dalrymple. The title became extinct on his death in 1980.

The first Baronet was the son of William Champneys, Dean of Lichfield from 1868 until 1875; and the younger brother of Weldon Champneys and Basil Champneys.

Champneys, later Dalrymple-Champneys baronets, of Littlemeads (1910)
Sir Francis Henry Champneys, 1st Baronet (1848–1930)
Sir Weldon Dalrymple-Champneys, 2nd Baronet (1892–1980)

Notes

References

External links
Biography of Sir Francis Champneys, Bt

Extinct baronetcies in the Baronetage of the United Kingdom